John Caspar Wister (March 19, 1887 – December 27, 1982) was one of the United States' most highly honored horticulturists.

Early life
A member of Philadelphia's prominent Wister family, John was the youngest of five children born to William Rotch Wister and Mary Rebecca Eustis in the Germantown section of Philadelphia. His sister Mary Channing Wister would marry her cousin Owen Wister, the author of "The Virginian".

As a small boy, John followed his family's gardener around their Belfield and Wister Estates, trying to learn anything and everything he could about plants.

In 1909, Wister graduated from Harvard University. He continued his studies at Harvard's School of Landscape Architecture, supplemented with courses at the New Jersey Agricultural College. He worked in landscape architecture offices in New York and Philadelphia until he enlisted on July 10, 1917, as a private in the Army.

World War I
Wister trained at the University of Pennsylvania and at Augusta Arsenal before serving in Jonchery, France, with Advance Ordnance Depot 4 during World War I. According to letters he wrote to his family during the war, Wister served most of his time in various ordnance departments, being promoted to Sergeant of Ordnance in November 1917. Wister never strayed far from plants and flowers, using his leave time to visit the gardens of Europe. He would often send plants back to his friends, the Arthur Hoyt Scotts, noted garden enthusiasts whom he met in 1915. He was honorably discharged from the Army on May 10, 1919.

Horticultural work
Wister helped organize the American Iris Society in 1920 and served as its first president for 14 years.

John Caspar Wister's research in cross-breeding produced hundreds of new hybrid species of common plants and flowers. In addition to the scientific research he performed on plants, he devoted a great deal of his time to sharing his knowledge of plants and the beauty he found in them with those around him. One of his many contributions to local Philadelphia horticulture was the campus of Swarthmore College, where he worked for more than 50 years. In order to recognize the work of Wister's good friends, the Arthur Hoyt Scotts, Swarthmore established the Arthur Hoyt Scott Horticultural Foundation and named Wister the foundation's first director in 1930. The Foundation's  public garden, with its 5,000 species of trees and shrubs adorns the Swarthmore campus,  of which were landscaped by Wister himself. He grouped plant families together within the garden to establish a more practical plan. Swarthmore College awarded Wister an honorary doctor of science degree in 1942 for his work with the college. Wister also operated a landscape architecture business out of the now-demolished Wister Mansion just off of La Salle University's campus in Philadelphia.

In 1946, Wister became the first director of the  John J. Tyler Arboretum in Lima, PA, serving as president of both the arboretum and bird sanctuary until 1968. In addition to this organization, he was active in most major scientific and conservation groups and was a member of about 50 horticultural societies and 30 scientific organizations. He served as secretary of the American Rose Society, president and founder of the American Iris Society, and secretary for 24 years of the Pennsylvania Horticultural Society. He was also intimately connected with the John Bartram Association in Philadelphia.

Recognition
Wister was the first recipient of four major horticulture awards: the Liberty Hyde Bailey Medal, the Scott Garden and Horticultural Award, the A.P. Saunders Memorial Award from the American Peony Society, and the Honor and Achievement Award from the International Lilac Society. He was honored for his outstanding work with flowers at the centennial celebration of the founding of the Pennsylvania Horticultural Society. The Brooklyn Botanic Garden awarded Wister its Garden Medal for outstanding service in 1966, and in that same year, the Royal Horticultural Society dedicated its Daffodil and Tulip Yearbook to him, making Wister the first American gardener to receive this honor.

The Wister Medal of the American Iris Society, their highest award for a tall-bearded iris, was named in his honor.

In 1927, Wister was awarded by The British Iris Society, the Foster Memorial Plaque (named after Michael Foster).

Marriage
Absorbed in flowers and plants, Wister did not marry until the age of 73, when he took as his wife Gertrude Smith, a noted horticulturist. Wister referred to marriage as "the fatal plunge" in one of his wartime letters.

Death
Wister, considered America's “Dean of Horticulturists”, died on December 27, 1982, at his home in Swarthmore. At the time of his death, Wister was director emeritus of both the Arthur Hoyt Scott Horticultural Foundation and the John J. Tyler Arboretum.  He is interred at Laurel Hill Cemetery in Philadelphia, Section M, Plot 128.

References

Bibliography
(Unless otherwise noted, all sources can be found in the Owen Wister and Family Collection, La Salle University, Connelly Library, Department of Special Collections.

 Arthur Hoyt Scott Horticultural Foundation, Swarthmore College, Swarthmore, PA. No publisher or publication date available. Available at the Swarthmore College Library.
 Bulbs for American Gardens (Boston: Stratford Company), 1930.
 Four Seasons In Your Garden (Philadelphia: Lippincott Publishers), 1938.
 A Horticulturist in the A.E.F. (Philadelphia: E. W. Haines), 1950. Subtitled as: "Letters from France from John C. Wister to Members of his Family, 1917–1919" and compiled by Ella Eustis Wister Haines.
 The Iris: A Treatise on the History, Development, and Culture of the Iris for the Amateur Gardener (New York: Orange Judd Publishing Company), 1930.
 Lilac Culture (New York: Orange Judd Publishing Company), 1930.
 Lilacs for America (Swarthmore, PA: Swarthmore College), 1943. Subtitled as: "Report of 1941 survey conducted by the Committee on Horticultural Varieties of the American Association of Botanical Gardens and Arboretums." Published for the Association of the Arthur Hoyt Scott Horticultural Foundation and edited by John C. Wister. Available at the Swarthmore College Library.
 The Peonies (Washington, D.C.: American Horticultural Society), 1962. Written by Myron D. Bigger, et al., and edited by John C. Wister. Available at the Swarthmore College Library.
 A Ten Year History, January 1, 1930 – December 31, 1939 (Swarthmore, PA: Swarthmore College), 1940. John C. Wister and the Arthur Hoyt Scott Horticultural Foundation are listed as co-authors. Available at the Swarthmore College Library.
 "Two Large Rhododendrons" (Aurora, Oregon: American Rhododendron Society), 1977. Published in the Quarterly Bulletin of the American Rhododendron Society, Vol. 31, No. 2. (Spring 1977).
 The Woman’s Home Companion Garden Book for all Sections of the United States and Canada (New York: P.F. Collier), 1947. Written by 50 horticultural specialists and edited by John C. Wister and assisted by Harry Wood, et al.

Sources
 Belman, Laura Haines. "Remarks at La Salle University, October 1, 1994." Unpublished manuscript presented at the dedication of the Mary and Frances Wister Fine Arts Studio at La Salle University. Available in the Ethel Langhorne Wister Chichester Papers, Connelly Library, Special Collections, Folder 137.
 Faust, Joan Lee. "John C. Wister, 95, Horticulturist." The New York Times, December 28, 1982. New York Times obituary article. Available in the Ethel Langhorne Wister Chichester Papers, Connelly Library, Special Collections, Folder 157.
 Haines, Ella Wister. Reminiscences of a Victorian Child. Philadelphia: E.W. Haines, 1953.
 Van Atta, Burr. "John Caspar Wister, known as the dean of horticulture in U.S." The Philadelphia Inquirer, December 29, 1982. Inquirer obituary article. Available in the Ethel Langhorne Wister Chichester Papers, Connelly Library, Special Collections, Folder 157.
 Votaw, Galja Barish. "John C. Wister." Chester Times, July 16, 1951. "Personality Sketch" from the Chester Times. Newspaper clipping found on front inside cover of A Horticulturist in the A.E.F: Letters from France from John C. Wister to Members of his Family, 1917–1919.

External links
 Belfield and Wakefield: A Link to La Salle's Past
 John Caspar Wister by Andy Gwiazda
 Special Collections at La Salle University's Connelly Library
 John Caspar Wister Collection (AFC/2001/001/02248), Veterans History Project, American Folklife Center, Library of Congress.

Wister family
1887 births
1982 deaths
American landscape architects
American horticulturists
Architects from Philadelphia
Harvard Graduate School of Design alumni